Bilbao and its metropolitan area has an oceanic climate according to the Köppen climate classification ( Cfb) with mild winters and warm summers. According to the Troll-Paffen climate classification, Bilbao has a temperate climate and according to the Siegmund/Frankenberg climate classification, Bilbao has a subtropical climate. According to the European Environment Agency, Bilbao lies within the Atlantic biogeographical region. The climate of Bilbao and the rest of the north-western part of Spain (the so-called Green Spain) is different from the rest of the country, characterized by a higher amount of rainfall and precipitation days, fewer sunshine hours and mild temperatures, in summer comparable to northern half of Europe with temperate climate.

Temperatures 

Said proximity to the ocean also makes that the two most defined seasons (summer and winter) remain mild, with low intensity thermal oscillations. Its average annual temperature is 19.1 °C during the day and 9.4 °C at night. In the coldest month – January, typically the temperature is around 13-14 °C during the day and 5 °C at night. In the warmest month – August, the typically temperature is around 25-26 °C during the day and about 15 °C at night.

Precipitation 
Bilbao has on average 128 precipitation days a year, therein average few to dozen rainy days per month (≥ 1 mm), ranging from 7 in July to 13 in January. The average annual precipitation is 1195 mm, ranging from 62 mm in July to 141 mm in November. This is one of the highest results in Spain, like the rest of Green Spain and Bay of Biscay area. Precipitation in the region is abundant, and given the latitude and atmospheric dynamics, rainy days represent 45% and cloudy days 40% of the annual total.

Humidity 
Average relative humidity is 72%, ranging from 70% in February and March to 74% in August and November.

Snow 
Snow is not frequent in the city, while it is possible to see snow on the top of the surrounding mountains. City recorded to few snow days per year. In February 1956 reported record: 7 of snow days in the month. Sleet is more frequent, about 10 days per year, mainly in the winter months.

Daylight 
Bilbao enjoys one of the most optimal number of hours of daylight in Europe. Days in winter are not as short as in the northern part of the continent, the average hours of daylight in December, January and February is 9.66 hours (for comparison: London or Moscow or Warsaw - about 8 hours).

Sunshine 
Sunshine duration is 1,584 hours per year, from 78 - average above 2.5 hours of sunshine at day in December to 188 - average above 6 hours of sunshine at day in July. This is similar result (range of 1,200-2,000 hours) which is recorded in the northern half of Europe, for example: London, Warsaw; but in winter Bilbao has about two times more sun duration than in the northern half of Europe. The city has up to two times less sunshine duration than other Spanish cities besides Green Spain area.

Temperature extremes 
The highest temperature ever recorded during the day in the city centre is 42 °C on 26 July 1947. In the month of August 2003, the average reported daytime maximum temperature was a record 29.9 °C. The coldest temperature ever recorded was -8.6 °C on the night of 3 February 1963.

Sea temperature
Average annual temperature of sea is about 16 °C. In February, the average sea temperature is 12 °C. In August, the average sea temperature is 21 °C. From July to September, average temperature of sea exceed 20 °C.

Climatic data for Bilbao area

See also 
Climate in other places in Iberian Peninsula:
 Climate of Barcelona
 Climate of Valencia
 Climate of Madrid
 Climate of Lisbon
 Climate of Gibraltar
 Climate of Spain

References 

Bilbao
Bilbao
Bilbao